Mecatina pronounced (me-kuh-TEE-nuh) is an Innu word that means large mountain.  It is also the name of two rivers (Big and Little), a school, and a municipality, on the Lower North Shore of the Gulf of Saint Lawrence of Quebec:

 Gros-Mécatina, Quebec
 Big Mecatina River
 Little Mecatina River